First event of Quaid-e-Azam Inter Provincial Youth Games in Islamabad. President Mamnoon Hussain open the first edition. First time  Punjab Sindh Baluchistan KPK  Islamabad Azad Jammu and Kashmir Gilgit-Baltistan and FATA teams participated  Punjab wins the first edition. Second Quaid-e-Azam Inter-Provincial Youth Games will start from 25 December with the participants over 3700 making it biggest sporting event in Pakistan.

Second Edition 

Second Quaid-e-Azam Inter-Provincial Youth Games will start from 25 December with the participants over 3700 making it biggest sporting event in Pakistan

Medal table
Punjab emerged as champions of the first edition of Quaid-e-Azam Inter-Provincial Games which concluded at the Pakistan Sports Complex in Islamabad.

Sports events 

 Athletics
 Badminton
 Football
 Hockey 
 Judo 
 Karate
 Squash
 Tennis
 Table tennis
 Taekwondo
 Volleyball

References 

Youth sport in Pakistan
Sport in Islamabad
Memorials to Muhammad Ali Jinnah
April 2016 sports events in Pakistan
Events in Islamabad